Jasenná is a municipality and village in Náchod District in the Hradec Králové Region of the Czech Republic. It has about 700 inhabitants.

References

Villages in Náchod District